David Martins Simão (born 15 May 1990) is a Portuguese professional footballer who plays as a midfielder for F.C. Arouca.

Club career
Born in Versailles, France, Simão played most of his youth career at S.L. Benfica, having arrived at the age of 10 from Grupo Instrução Musical Desportiva Abóboda. On 19 January 2008, he was called to the first team for a Taça de Portugal tie against C.D. Feirense, courtesy of manager José Antonio Camacho, and was even picked to both UEFA Cup round-of-16 matches against Getafe CF, not being used however in any of the three fixtures.

Simão made his professional debut with C.D. Fátima, on loan, his first appearance being against C.D. Santa Clara in the 2009–10 season opener in the Segunda Liga, a 1–0 away loss. On 26 September 2009, he scored his first goal for the side, in a 1–1 away draw to Gil Vicente FC.

On 17 June 2010, Simão moved to F.C. Paços de Ferreira, still on loan. He made his Primeira Liga debut on 14 August in a 1–0 home win over Sporting CP, and only missed five league games (19 starts, 2,051 minutes of action) during the campaign as the team finished in seventh position.

Simão returned to Benfica for 2011–12 but, deemed surplus to requirements by manager Jorge Jesus, he moved to fellow league side Académica de Coimbra again on loan, on 17 January 2012. He scored his first goal for his new club on 26 March, netting from 40 yards in a 2–1 defeat at S.C. Braga.

On 31 July 2012, Simão was loaned to C.S. Marítimo in a season-long move. He terminated his contract with Benfica late into June of the following year, and signed a three-year deal with F.C. Arouca also in the top flight.

Aged 26, Simão moved abroad for the first time in his career, joining First Professional Football League (Bulgaria) club PFC CSKA Sofia for three years. On 28 May 2017, he netted twice in The Eternal Derby to help overcome PFC Levski Sofia 3–0, but left on 31 August of that year to immediately sign with Boavista FC.

Simão moved teams and countries again in January 2019, agreeing to a contract at Royal Antwerp F.C. of the Belgian First Division A. On 22 June, he switched to the Super League Greece with AEK Athens FC, signing until 2022 for an undisclosed fee.

In February 2020, Simão was loaned to Israeli Premier League side Hapoel Be'er Sheva FC. He and compatriots Miguel Vítor and Josué Pesqueira won the Israeli State Cup on 13 July with a 2–0 final victory over Hapoel Petah Tikva FC.

Personal life
Simão's older brother, Bruno, was also a footballer, in the defender position.

Career statistics

Honours
Académica
Taça de Portugal: 2011–12

Hapoel Be'er Sheva
Israel State Cup: 2019–20

Individual
SJPF Young Player of the Month: December 2012, January 2013

References

External links

1990 births
Living people
People from Versailles
French people of Portuguese descent
Portuguese footballers
French footballers
Association football midfielders
Primeira Liga players
Liga Portugal 2 players
S.L. Benfica footballers
C.D. Fátima players
F.C. Paços de Ferreira players
Associação Académica de Coimbra – O.A.F. players
C.S. Marítimo players
F.C. Arouca players
Boavista F.C. players
Moreirense F.C. players
First Professional Football League (Bulgaria) players
PFC CSKA Sofia players
Belgian Pro League players
Royal Antwerp F.C. players
Super League Greece players
AEK Athens F.C. players
Israeli Premier League players
Hapoel Be'er Sheva F.C. players
Portugal youth international footballers
Portugal under-21 international footballers
Portuguese expatriate footballers
Expatriate footballers in Bulgaria
Expatriate footballers in Belgium
Expatriate footballers in Greece
Expatriate footballers in Israel
Portuguese expatriate sportspeople in Bulgaria
Portuguese expatriate sportspeople in Belgium
Portuguese expatriate sportspeople in Greece
Portuguese expatriate sportspeople in Israel